Orfani (formerly Ορφάνιον - Orfanion) is a village and a former municipality in the Kavala regional unit, East Macedonia and Thrace, Greece. Since the 2011 local government reform it is part of the municipality Pangaio, of which it is a municipal unit (municipal unit of Orfano). The municipal unit has an area of 200.862 km2. The municipal unit has a population of 5,249, and the village of Orfani has 706 inhabitants (2011). The seat of the municipality was Galipsos.

Called Orfano in the 19th century, the town has been identified with the Byzantine Chrysopolis in Macedonia.

References

Populated places in Kavala (regional unit)

el:Δήμος Παγγαίου#Δημοτική ενότητα Ορφανού